E. M. Rose (born 1959) is a historian of medieval and early modern England and a journalist, and the inaugural visiting scholar in the Program in Medieval Studies at Harvard University, best known for the book The Murder of William of Norwich. Rose worked as a producer at CNN for a decade prior to beginning a career as a historian.

The Murder of William of Norwich
E. M. Rose’s first book, The Murder of William of Norwich: The Origins of the Blood Libel in Medieval Europe, published by Oxford University Press in 2015 was reviewed as a landmark in the study of the history of the Blood libel, as the first detailed, academic investigation into the circumstances surrounding the death of William of Norwich, the historical incident to which the Blood libel can be traced.

The Murder of William of Norwich was recognized as a "Top Ten Book in History" by The Sunday Times (London) and received the 2016 Ralph Waldo Emerson Award of the Phi Beta Kappa Society for "a scholarly study that contributes significantly to interpretation of the intellectual and cultural condition of humanity."

References

Living people
1959 births
American medievalists
20th-century American historians
American male non-fiction writers
21st-century American historians
American women historians
21st-century American women writers
Harvard University faculty
CNN people
Women medievalists
20th-century American women writers